Gluconacetobacter azotocaptans is a species of acetic acid bacteria first isolated from rhizospheres and rhizoplanes of coffee plants. Its type strain is CFN-Ca54T (= ATCC 70098ST = DSM 13594T).

References

Further reading

Morley, Robyn. "Impact of free-living diazotrophs, Azospirillum lipoferum and Gluconacetobacter azotocaptans, on growth and nitrogen utilization by wheat (Triticum aestivum cv. Lillian)." (2013).
Zchori-Fein, Einat, and Kostas Bourtzis, eds. Manipulative tenants: bacteria associated with arthropods. CRC Press, 2011.

External links

LPSN
Type strain of Gluconacetobacter azotocaptans at BacDive -  the Bacterial Diversity Metadatabase

Rhodospirillales